A Better Master is a 1928 German silent comedy film directed by Gustav Ucicky and starring Leo Peukert, Lydia Potechina and Willi Forst. It is based upon the play by Walter Hasenclever.

It was made at the Emelka Studios in Munich. The film's sets were designed by the art director Ludwig Reiber.

Cast
Leo Peukert as Milliardär Kompaß
Lydia Potechina as Seine Frau
Rita Roberts as Seine Tochter
Fritz Kampers as Möbius, ein Heiratsschwindler
Elisabeth Pinajeff as Madame Prandon, eine Tänzerin
Karl Graumann as Schmettau, ein Detektiv
Gustl Helminger as Frau Schnütchen, eine Witwe
Willi Forst as Sohn von Kompaß

References

External links

Films of the Weimar Republic
German silent feature films
Films directed by Gustav Ucicky
1928 comedy films
German comedy films
German films based on plays
Bavaria Film films
German black-and-white films
Films shot at Bavaria Studios
Silent comedy films
1920s German films
1920s German-language films